According to PC Magazine, the chief information officer, or CIO, is defined as the executive officer in charge of information processing in an organization. All systems design, development and datacenter operations fall under CIO jurisdiction. CIOs have demanding jobs as information systems in an organization are often taken for granted until something breaks down. The CIO is responsible for explaining to executive management the complex nightmare this industry has gotten itself into over the past 40 years and why equipment must be constantly retrofitted or replaced. Justifying new expenditures can be a difficult part of the job.

Increasingly, CIOs are involved in creating business and e-business opportunities through information technology. Collaborating with other executives, CIOs are often working at the core of business development within the organization.

Fractional CIOs differ from traditional CIOs in that they serve as a working member of a company's executive management team as a contractor and may or may not serve on the company's board of directors. 

A fractional CIO, also known as a part-time CIO, parachute CIO, or CIO on-demand, is an experienced, multi-faceted professional who serves as the part-time chief information officer of a small or medium-sized business that otherwise could not afford or would not need a full-time executive to hold the position of chief information officer. A virtual CIO or vCIO may have a similar role, but the term virtual suggests that the individual is not present in the organisation on the same basis as an employed executive. An interim CIO is generally retained for a limited time period, often to oversee a specific project or to cover an interregnum.  As with traditional CIOs, a fractional CIO often helps with technology roadmaps, business process improvements, and business technology strategy. 

The key business benefit of retaining a fractional CIO is that they provide the same expertise and capability of a full-time CIO without the associated level of overhead and benefits associated with adding another top-level executive. Care, however, must be taken to ensure the skills of the fractional CIO align primarily with the needs of the business, and not weighted with technical expertise in order to achieve the best results.

Fractional CIOs typically serve several companies and may or may not engage in the day-to-day management of a company's IT staff or other resources.

See also 
 Chief information officer

References 

Management occupations
People in information technology